Devil's Gate may refer to:

Places

United States 
 Devil's Gate (Nevada), a natural rock formation
 Devil's Gate (Wyoming), a natural rock formation
 Massacre Rocks in Idaho, another rock formation alternatively known as Devil's Gate
 Devil's Gate Pass, a mountain pass in Mono County, California
 Devil's Gate Dam, a flood-control dam in L.A. County, California, named after a nearby rock formation
 Devil's Gate-Weber Hydroelectric Power Plant in Utah

Other countries 
 Devil's Gate 220, a Mikisew Cree reserve in Alberta, Canada
 Devil's Gate Cave (Chertovy Vorota Cave), an archaeological cave in Russia
 Devil's Gate (Crimea), a natural rock formation
 Devils Gate Power Station and Devils Gate Dam in northern Tasmania, Australia

Arts and literature 
 Devil's Gate (2004 film), a British film directed by Stuart St. Paul
 Devil's Gate (2017 film), an American film directed by Clay Staub
 "Devil's Gate", an episode of The Flying House anime series
 "Devil's Gate", a track on Dark Room by Australian rock group The Angels
 Devil's Gate (novel), a 2011 novel by Clive Cussler and Graham Brown